Urothemis assignata, the Red basker, is a species of dragonfly in the family Libellulidae.

Distribution
It is found in Angola, Benin, Botswana, Cameroon, the Democratic Republic of the Congo, Ivory Coast, Equatorial Guinea, Ethiopia, Gambia, Ghana, Guinea, Kenya, Liberia, Madagascar, Malawi, Mozambique, Namibia, Niger, Nigeria, Senegal, Somalia, South Africa, Tanzania, Togo, Uganda, Zambia, Zimbabwe, and possibly Burundi.

Habitat
Its natural habitats are rivers, shrub-dominated wetlands, freshwater lakes, intermittent freshwater lakes, freshwater marshes, and intermittent freshwater marshes.

Description

Gallery

References

Odonata of Africa
Insects of South Africa
Insects described in 1872
Libellulidae
Taxonomy articles created by Polbot